The Skate Canada Hall of Fame is the sports hall of fame for figure skating maintained by Skate Canada. It was established in 1990 as the Canadian Figure Skating Hall of Fame. The members are inducted into one of four categories that best represents the inductee's contributions to skating in Canada: athletes, coaches, builders, and officials.  There is no physical home for the Hall of Fame; the offices of Skate Canada house historical artifacts and information about its honoured members.

Members

References

Hall of Fame
Figure skating organizations
Figure skating museums and halls of fame
Halls of fame in Canada
Canadian sports trophies and awards
Awards established in 1990